Redford Union High School (RUHS) is a secondary school in Redford, Michigan, a suburb of Detroit. The school is affiliated with the Redford Union School District and serves grades 9-12.

History

Redford Union High School's first graduating class matriculated in 1925. The current building was built in 1954.

Demographics
The gender breakdown of the 744 students enrolled in 2014-2015 was:
Male - 52.6%
Female - 47.4%
The demographic breakdown was:
Native American/Alaskan - 0.3%
Asian/Pacific islanders - 0.4%
Black - 57.0%
Hispanic - 2.2%
White - 36.8%
Multiracial - 3.3%

64.0% of the students were eligible for free or reduced lunch.

Athletics
The Redford Union Panthers are members of the Western Wayne Athletic Conference. The school colors are blue and gold. The following MHSAA sanctioned sports are offered:

Baseball (boys)
Bowling (boys and girls)
Competitive cheer (girls)
Cross country (boys and girls)
Football (boys)
Golf (boys)
Soccer (boys and girls)
Softball (girls)
Swim and dive (boys and girls)
Tennis (boys and girls)
Track and field (boys and girls)
Volleyball (girls)
Wrestling (boys)

The football team plays their home games at Kraft Field, located at nearby Hilbert Middle School.  In 1969, the boys track team won the state championship.

Notable alumni
 Rickey Clark, former MLB pitcher (California Angels).
 Bill Fahey, former MLB catcher (Washington Senators, Texas Rangers, San Diego Padres, Detroit Tigers).
Paul Waterman, businessman and CEO Castrol, CEO Elementis plc  2016
 Antoinette Harris, groundbreaking female football player.
 John Koza (class of 1960), co-inventor of the scratch-off lottery ticket.
 Mike Stefanski, former MiLB catcher, and the current catching coordinator for the Cincinnati Reds.

References

External links
 Redford Union Home page

Public high schools in Michigan
Schools in Wayne County, Michigan
1925 establishments in Michigan
Redford, Michigan